Dead Effect 2 is a 2015 video game developed and published by BadFly Interactive. It is a sequel to Dead Effect.

Gameplay
The gameplay mechanics of Dead Effect 2 are similar to the original game. In the default setup, movement is controlled by a virtual joystick on the left of the screen, with sight and aim controlled by the player moving their finger across the touch screen, although there are two shortcut buttons on the left and right of the screen to allow the player to instantly turn 90 degrees to the left or right. Players can use explosives, iron sights, reload, change weapons, shoot and enter slow motion mode using virtual buttons on the right of the screen. Controls can be customized from the main menu, with each icon individually repositionable as the player sees fits. Unlike the original game player character fires automatically when their reticle rests on enemy.

In story mode, the player can play as Gunnar Davis, Jane Frey or Kay Rayner. Unlike the first game there is difference in weaponry. Davis is a specialist in heavy weaponry, Jane Frey uses shotgun and Rayner uses melee weapons. Davis features gameplay that is the most similar to the original game.

The Steam version of the game was released on May 6, 2016 and features cooperative multiplayer and player versus player.

Plot

The story of Dead Effect 2 is a rather simple one to follow. After the death of Professor Wagner, the head of the experiments onboard the ship, soldiers are sent from Earth to approach the ship and purge all evidences of anything ever happening. This is due to the outbreak of the Dead Effect; a virus that was in an experimental stage to try and preserve life as we know it, allowing immortality to those affected. However, after a close encounter with one subject during a test, Professor Wagner was killed, and his failed creations (the zombies) were set loose on the vast ship in order to cause distraction and allow the conscious victims to escape. Throughout the rest of the story players embark on a mission to secure the evidence of what happened, all whilst avoiding the threat of the incoming soldiers.

Reception
The mobile version of Dead Effect 2 has received positive reviews it holds 78% on Metacritic.

The PC version of Dead Effect 2 has a score of 53% on Metacritic.

Controversy
COGconnected reported that developer BadFly Interactive offered them Dead Effect 2 review codes. The email with codes included a warning: "if the review or preview of Dead Effect 2 is very negative, you won't receive any keys from us in the future." This spawned criticism from vmedia towards company. Martin Pospisil from BadFly Interactive admitted that company made a mistake and said that it was caused by experience from some reviews that compared their games with big AAA titles like Left 4 Dead or Mass Effect, which led to very low ratings. He said that BadFly will not blacklist any magazine for negative review if it is fair and honest.

Possible sequel
In June 2016, BadFly Interactive’s CEO and Creative Director Lubomír Dykast said that BadFly Interactive is working on a game that will take place in the same game universe, although it will not be a direct sequel to Dead Effect 2. The possible sequel's name is revealed to be Tau Ceti. It was expected to launch in 2020.

References

External links 
 

2015 video games
Android (operating system) games
Early access video games
First-person shooters
IOS games
MacOS games
PlayStation 4 games
Science fiction video games
Single-player video games
Video games about zombies
Video games developed in the Czech Republic
Video games featuring protagonists of selectable gender
Windows games
Video game sequels